South Glamorganshire was a parliamentary constituency in Glamorganshire, Wales.  It returned one Member of Parliament (MP) to the House of Commons of the Parliament of the United Kingdom, elected by the first past the post system.

Overview
The constituency was created by the Redistribution of Seats Act 1885 for the 1885 general election. Of all the Glamorgan seats created by the 1885 redistribution, South Glamorgan was the only one where the Liberal Party could not be assured of victory. The Bute and Dunraven families exercised a powerful influence. The mining areas in the north of the constituency, including the lower reaches of the Rhondda, and the cosmopolitan town of Barry were strongly Liberal but these were juxtaposed against the conservatism of the Vale of Glamorgan and the genteel settlements of Penarth and Llandaff.

The constituency was abolished for the 1918 general election.

Boundaries
Created in the redistribution of seats in 1885 from the old Glamorganshire constituency which had been in existence since 1541, the seat covered a wide area that included Bridgend, Porthcawl, Coity, Ewenny, Ogmore, Llanharry, Llanharan,  Llantwit Major, Dinas Powis, Pendoylan, Bonvilston, Barry, Penarth, Tonyrefail, Pontyclun and Beddau, and areas which are now part of Cardiff (including St Fagans, Radyr, Whitchurch, Llanishen and Lisvane). Cowbridge and Llantrisant were excluded from South Glamorganshire, being contributory boroughs of Cardiff District of Boroughs constituency.

The constituency was scrapped in the next redistribution of seats that took place in 1918.

Members of Parliament

History

Major Wyndham-Quin
From 1885 until 1895 the seat was held by the Liberals but in 1895 it was captured by a Conservative landowner, who held the seat with a reduced majority in 1900.

William Brace
In 1903, South Glamorgan became the focus of an internal battle within the Liberal Party around whether a labour representative should become the candidate. Although the miners composed only a fifth of the electorate, the claims of William Brace, vice president of the South Wales Miners Federation were also championed by the dockworkers of Barry. Following the intervention of the Liberal Chief Whip, Brace was duly chosen and won the seat in 1906. He held it until its abolition in 1918.

Elections

Elections in the 1880s

Elections in the 1890s

Elections in the 1900s

Elections in the 1910s

General Election 1914–15:

Another General Election was required to take place before the end of 1915. The political parties had been making preparations for an election to take place and by the July 1914, the following candidates had been selected;
Labour:  William Brace
Liberal Roland Philipps
Unionist: Frank Gaskell

See also
 A map of Glamorganshire in 1885, showing its new divisions.
Boundary Commission Map Report from 1885 showing detailed original maps used
The National Library for Wales: A Dictionary of Welsh Biography (Windham Henry Wyndham-Quin, 5th Earl Dunraven and Mount-Earl)
The National Library for Wales: A Dictionary of Welsh Biography (William Brace)

References

Sources

Books and Journals
 
 

History of Glamorgan
Historic parliamentary constituencies in South Wales
Constituencies of the Parliament of the United Kingdom established in 1885
Constituencies of the Parliament of the United Kingdom disestablished in 1918
South Glamorgan